Kuhler is a surname. Notable people with the surname include:

 Lorraine Kuhler (born 1990), English lawn and indoor bowler
 Louis Kuhler (1902–1925), American tennis player
 Otto Kuhler (1894–1977), German-American industrial designer and artist

See also
 Kohler